Macarani is a municipality in the state of Bahia in the North-East region of Brazil. As of 2020, Macarani had a population of 18,909.

See also
List of municipalities in Bahia

References

Municipalities in Bahia